George Leslie Harrison (January 26, 1887 – March 5, 1958) was an American banker, insurance executive and advisor to Secretary of War Henry L. Stimson during World War II.

Early life and education
Harrison was born in San Francisco, California on January 26, 1887. In 1909, at Yale, he was elected to the Skull and Bones secret society.  He was graduated from Yale University in 1910 and Harvard Law School in 1913.

Career
After earning his law degree, Harrison became law clerk for one year to U.S. Supreme Court Justice Oliver Wendell Holmes.

After serving as general counsel to the Federal Reserve Board, Harrison served as president of the Federal Reserve Bank of New York for 13 years starting in 1928. He left in 1941 to become president of New York Life Insurance Company.

During World War II, Harrison was War Secretary Henry L. Stimson's special assistant for matters relating to the development of the atomic bomb. One of Harrison's notable moments was when he informed Secretary Stimson of the success detonation of the atomic bomb testing in New Mexico. Specifically, he wrote that“Doctor has just returned most enthusiastic and confident that the little boy is as husky as his big brother. The light in his eyes discernible from here to high hold and I could have heard his screams from here to my farm.”The meaning of this quote is that the "Little Boy" atomic bomb (made of Uranium-235) was as successful as the "Fat Man" bomb (made of plutonium). The light from here to high hold refers how the detonation was visible from "here" in Washington, D.C. to Stimson's Highhold estate nearly 250 miles away on Long Island. The bomb was so loud that Harrison could hear the detonation from "here" in Washington, D.C. to his farm on Upperville, VA nearly 50 miles away.

After the successful development of the atomic bomb, he served with Stimson on the eight-member Interim Committee which examined problems expected to result from the bomb's creation and which recommended direct military use of the bomb against Japan without specific warning.  Harrison chaired the committee when Stimson was absent.

Harrison returned to his position at New York Life after the war, becoming chairman of the company's board in 1948.

Personal life
Harrison married the widow of Rear Admiral Cary T. Grayson, who was the former Alice Gertrude Gordon.

He died of a cerebral hemorrhage in New York City in 1958 and is buried in Rock Creek Cemetery in Washington, DC.

See also 
 List of law clerks of the Supreme Court of the United States (Seat 2)

References

External links
Harrison's Biography at the Federal Reserve Bank of New York
 

1887 births
1958 deaths
Burials at Rock Creek Cemetery
Businesspeople from San Francisco
Federal Reserve Bank of New York presidents
Harvard Law School alumni
Law clerks of the Supreme Court of the United States
New York Life Insurance Company
Skull and Bones Society
Yale University alumni
20th-century American businesspeople